Cranborne Chase School was an independent boarding school for girls, originally opened in 1946 at Crichel House in the village of Moor Crichel in Dorset. In 1961, the school moved to New Wardour Castle near Tisbury in Wiltshire, and extensively renovated the building, which had fallen into a severe state of disrepair.

In 1985 there were 130 girls, aged between 11 and 18 years, and 26 teachers at the school. The school eventually closed in July 1990.

Wardour facilities 
At New Wardour Castle (not to be confused with Wardour Castle) there were dormitories for girls in the 1st to 4th Forms around the top fourth floor of the building, each with beds for between two and six girls. Fifth Formers slept on the mezzanine floor below this. The Lower Sixth Form had studios for one or two girls in a modern extension on the south-eastern side of the building. Upper Sixth formers all had their own individual rooms in the upper East Wing flat or in a separate building known as 'The Hexagon' ( The Hexagon was used as accommodation for staff in the late-1970s).

Pupils ate in the modern dining hall built on the south-eastern side of the building, next to the gymnasium. This extension had additional modern classrooms for Art and Science. All other classrooms were in the main building on the ground and first floors.

A student assembly was held most mornings around the rotunda staircase, with each year standing in groups between the columns. This usually included a short religious ceremony and singing accompaniment on the rotunda organ.

Other facilities included a school chapel and student laundry rooms. Each year had its own common room to relax in, when not in class.

Outside, there was an open-air swimming pool in the walled garden, six tennis courts and a running track, with space for field sports on the front lawn. There was also an enclosure for outdoor pets, which students were encouraged to keep.

In addition to the Hexagon building, there were three houses for staff and their families. These were built in the 1970s and were referred to as Melbury, LongAsh (Long Ash was used for 6th form students in the late-1970s) a grea and Burwood. Other staff lived in flats within the main building or else commuted from the surrounding area.

Other outdoor features included a bicycle shed, a water well, a temple folly, a Camellia house, and a sewage treatment works and an ice house.

Notable former pupils

 Josceline Dimbleby, cookery writer
 Mandy Ford, Anglican priest
 Princess Tatiana von Fürstenberg, singer, actress and socialite
 Amaryllis Garnett, actress
 Veronica Linklater, Baroness Linklater of Butterstone (1943–2022), a Liberal Democrat  member of the House of Lords
 Roxanna Panufnik, composer
 Jane Ridley, author, biographer, commentator and Professor of Modern History at the University of Buckingham
 Joanna Waley-Cohen, professor of history at New York University
 Harriet Walter, actress
 Iona Brown, conductor and violinist
 Madeleine Redfern, Mayor, City of Iqaluit

Aftermath
Betty Galton, the founding headmistress of Cranborne Chase School died in December 2005.

The 2009 movie, Tanner Hall, written and co-directed by alumna Tatiana von Furstenberg, was loosely based on her experiences as a pupil there.

References

External links
Wiltshire Community History

Boarding schools in Dorset
Boarding schools in Wiltshire
Defunct schools in Dorset
Defunct schools in Wiltshire
Girls' schools in Dorset
Girls' schools in Wiltshire
Educational institutions established in 1946
Educational institutions disestablished in 1990
1990 disestablishments in England
Defunct boarding schools in England
1946 establishments in England